Cimpa are a variety of related cakes cooked by the Karo of North Sumatra, made of rice flour, coconut and palm sugar.

Four varieties of cimpa are produced:

 Cimpa tuang - made from rice flour, grated coconut, palm sugar, and water. The mixture is made into a batter, which is fried like a pancake
 Cimpa unung-unung - made from purple glutinous rice flour, grated coconut, palm sugar, and water. The ingredients are mixed into a dough, and are placed into individual singkut-leaf wrappers (singkut is a plant from the genus curculigo in the family of hypoxidaceae).
 Cimpa bohan - made using purple glutinous rice flour, palm sugar, and grated coconut, cooked inside bamboo
 Cimpa matah

Cimpa are traditionally consumed on the sixth day of the Kerja Tahun festival.

References

External links
 Cimpa, makanan khas Suku Karo (video)

Batak cuisine
Batak Karo